Rosanne (Rosie) Fitzgibbon (1947–2012) was a literary editor in Australia. She worked for forty years in the publishing of fiction and non-fiction, including as fiction editor at the University of Queensland Press from 1989 to 2005. She worked in collaboration with many of Australia's best-known authors including Thea Astley, Peter Carey, Kate Grenville, and Janette Turner Hospital. Her papers are held in the Fryer Library at the University of Queensland.

Edited works
 The gift of story: three decades of UQP short stories (1998)
 One book many Brisbanes : an anthology of Brisbane stories (2006)

References

Literary editors
1947 births
2012 deaths